The 5-Hour Energy 250 was a NASCAR Nationwide Series race held at Gateway International Raceway in Madison, Illinois.

Past winners

References

External links
 

Former NASCAR races
NASCAR Xfinity Series races